In mathematics, a twisted sheaf  is a variant of a coherent sheaf. Precisely, it is specified by: an open covering in the étale topology Ui, coherent sheaves Fi over Ui, a Čech 2-cocycle θ on the covering Ui as well as the isomorphisms

satisfying
,

The notion of twisted sheaves was introduced by Jean Giraud.

See also 
 Reflexive sheaf
 Torsion sheaf

References 

Geometry